In enzymology, an omega-hydroxydecanoate dehydrogenase is an enzyme that catalyzes the chemical reaction
10-hydroxydecanoate + NAD+ ⇌ 10-oxodecanoate + NADH + H+

Thus, the two substrates of this enzyme are 10-hydroxydecanoate and NAD+, whereas its 3 products are 10-oxodecanoate, NADH, and H+.

This enzyme belongs to the family of oxidoreductases, specifically those acting on the CH-OH group of donor with NAD+ or NADP+ as acceptor. The systematic name of this enzyme class is 10-hydroxydecanoate:NAD+ 10-oxidoreductase.

References

 
 

EC 1.1.1
NADH-dependent enzymes
Enzymes of unknown structure